Indonesia competed at the 2013 Southeast Asian Games. The 27th Southeast Asian Games took place in Naypyidaw, the capital of Myanmar, as well as in two other main cities, Yangon and Mandalay.

Medalists

Medal by sports

Medal table

References

Nations at the 2013 Southeast Asian Games
2013